Kevin Priola is an American politician who serves in the Colorado Senate from the 13th district as a member of the Democratic Party. Prior to decennial redistricting he also represented the 25th district. Prior to his tenure in the state senate he served in the Colorado House of Representatives from the 30th and 56th districts from 2009 to 2017. Until 2022, he served as a member of the Republican Party.

Priola was born in Brighton, Colorado, and educated at the University of Colorado Boulder where he joined the College Republicans. He joined the Republican Party at age seventeen and was elected to the state house from the 30th district in the 2008 election. During his tenure in the state house he served as a whip, but resigned in 2014 following an unsuccessful attempt to remove him. He was elected to the state senate in the 2016 election. He switched parties to the Democratic Party on August 22, 2022, citing Republican attempts to overturn the 2020 United States presidential election.

Priola was redistricted into the 13th district.

Early life

Kevin Priola was born in Brighton, Colorado. He attended the University of Colorado Boulder from 1992 to 1996, and graduated with a Bachelor of Science degree in finance and accounting and a minor in economics. He became a Republican at age seventeen and was a member of the College Republicans. He married Michelle, with whom he had four children.

Career

Priola ran for the Republican nomination for a seat in the Colorado House of Representatives in the 30th district in the 2008 election and won in the general election against Democratic nominee Dave Rose. He defeated Democratic nominee Laura Huerta in the 2010 election. He defeated Democratic nominee Rose and Libertarian nominee Will Hiltscher in the 2012 election. He defeated Democratic nominee Vicki A. Snider and Libertarian nominee Chris Baerns in the 2014 election.

Priola ran for a seat in the Colorado Senate from the 25th district and defeated Democratic nominee Jenise May in the 2016 election. He defeated Democratic nominee Paula Dickerson in the 2020 election. He over-performed Donald Trump by over 10% in the 2020 election in his district.

He served as a whip during his tenure in the state house, but resigned from his position in 2014, the day after Representative Chris Holbert unsuccessfully attempted to have him removed from the position due to Priola not supporting a Republican amendment to legislation. During his tenure in the state senate he served on the Business, Labor and Technology, and Education committees. He was considered as a possible running mate for Walker Stapleton in the 2018 gubernatorial election, but Lang Sias was selected instead.

Political positions

Priola is considered a moderate in his district, and has worked with Democrats in sponsoring or supporting bipartisan bills. He voted in favor of legislation to allow municipalities to require affordable housing which had been prohibited since a ruling by the Colorado Supreme Court in 2000. He was the only Republican in the state senate to vote in favor of legislation to prevent landlords from using or disclosing the citizenship or immigration status of their tenants.

He sponsored legislation to exempt teachers from the Colorado Open Records Act in order to prevent doxing being conducted against teachers. Priola was the only Republican to vote in favor of legislation to prohibit employers from retaliating against their workers for reporting health and safety concerns or violations.

He co-sponsored legislation to repeal the death penalty, and at one point was the only Republican supporter of the bill, stating that he opposes capital punishment due to his Catholic beliefs and how it disproportionately targets black people. He voted in favor of reducing the sentence of felony murder from life in prison without parole to a maximum of forty-eight years.

He and Senator Brittany Pettersen created legislation to allow for supervised injection sites to combat the opioid epidemic. Patrick Neville, the Republican Minority Leader in the state house, threatened to have recall attempts made against Democratic members of the Colorado General Assembly who supported the legislation, but not against Priola. Priola sponsored legislation to prohibit the selling or marketing of flavored products by cigarette, tobacco, or nicotine retailers.

Priola sponsored legislation in 2014 that would prohibit abortions, except to prevent the death of the mother, and make it a class three felony. He received an F rating from NARAL Pro-Choice America.

He voted in favor of legislation to allow transgender and nonbinary people to change their names and gender on identifications without surgery or judicial requirements, and voted in favor of legislation to prohibit gay conversion therapy. He cosponsored legislation to make HIV prevention drugs available without the need of a prescription. He has also supported anti-LGBT religious-exemption legislation. 

After the January 6 United States Capitol attack, he called for President Trump to be removed from office through either the Twenty-fifth Amendment or impeachment. Priola was the only Republican to vote in favor of a resolution calling for the passage of voting rights legislation at the federal level while fifteen Republican members of the state senate voted in favor of unsuccessful amendments to the resolution thanking the Capitol attackers and decertifying the 2020 presidential election.

On August 22, 2022, Priola announced he was leaving the Republican Party and joining the Democratic Party, citing Republicans' attempts to overturn the 2020 election and denial of climate change.

Electoral history

References

External links
 Campaign website
 Legislative website

Living people
University of Colorado Boulder alumni
Members of the Colorado House of Representatives
Colorado Democrats
Colorado Republicans
College Republicans
21st-century American politicians
Colorado state senators
1973 births
Democratic Party Colorado state senators